The Kohenet Institute, also known as the Kohenet Hebrew Priestess Institute, is a Jewish neopagan organization which trains women to be Jewish spiritual leaders. The institute was founded in November 2005 by Rabbi Jill Hammer and Holly Taya Shere, and held its first training program on August 14–20, 2006, at the Elat Chayyim Retreat Center in Accord, New York. In July 2009, the institute ordained for the first time 11 women as kohanot (priestesses). As of early 2021 the institute has graduated almost 100 women as priestesses. Ordination requires the completion of a three-year training and program including 13 paths which explore different "female archetypes".

The organization has been criticized by some Jewish leaders for its embrace of pagan rituals.

References

External links
 Official website

Judaism and women
Jewish educational organizations
Modern pagan organizations based in the United States
Priesthood (Judaism)